The Drew Carey Show is an American television sitcom that aired on ABC from September 13, 1995, to September 8, 2004. Set in Cleveland, Ohio, the series revolved around the retail office and home life of "everyman" Drew Carey, a fictionalized version of the comedian.

The show was created by Carey, who had both stand-up comedy and writing experience, and television writer and producer Bruce Helford.

Produced by Mohawk Productions in association with Warner Bros. Television, it debuted on September 13, 1995, received positive reviews from critics and ranked among the Top 30 programs for four seasons before sliding in popularity. Ratings declined sharply during the final two seasons, and the last two episodes aired on September 8, 2004.

Premise

Drew Carey is a fictionalized version of himself, a self-proclaimed "everyman". Drew Carey (the comedian) has explained that his character is what the actor would have been if he had not become an actor. He has a core  group of friends who embark with him on his everyday trials and tribulations. Drew's friends include erudite but unambitious Lewis (Ryan Stiles), excitable dimwitted Oswald (Diedrich Bader) and his friend (later on-off girlfriend) Kate (Christa Miller). In the final two seasons, Kate gets married and moves to Guam, in the same two-part episode that introduces and develops Drew's relationship with Kellie (Cynthia Watros), which carries on over the final two seasons.

For its first seven seasons, Drew's workplace is the office of fictional Cleveland department store Winfred-Louder, where he has worked for years and still works as assistant director of Personnel. One of his coworkers is Mimi Bobeck (Kathy Kinney), a large woman with a clownish wardrobe, a lot of make-up (including her trademark bright blue eye shadow), and a foul mutual dislike for Drew. The two eventually become closer (although still maintaining a less heated rivalry), primarily because Mimi fell in love with and married Drew's cross-dressing heterosexual brother Steve (John Carroll Lynch), a frequently recurring character.

In the first season they work for the unseen Mr. Bell (Kevin Pollak), only seen in the season one finale, to which he is greeted with applause; in later seasons, their boss and sometimes-co-worker is Nigel Wick (Craig Ferguson), an eccentric, sadistic and unlucky Englishman. In the final two seasons, they work for peaceful, hippie-like Evan (Kyle Howard) and the much more professional Scott (Jonathan Mangum), tech-smart but naïve twenty-somethings who own the Neverending Store, an online retailer with offices in the same location.

In addition to his day job, Drew, along with Oswald, Lewis, and Kate (replaced from around Season 5 onwards by Mimi), runs a small business out of his garage, selling Buzz Beer, a caffeinated alcoholic drink. It becomes popular in the region and is served at the group's hangout, The Warsaw Tavern.

Synopsis

Season 1 (1995–1996)
The first season's opening credits consisted of a caricature of Carey—consisting of his face and a yellow tie—singing the Robert McGuire-penned "Moon Over Parma". The song was trimmed for the opening sequence, and the reference to Eastlake in the line "Guide her to Eastlake underneath your silvery light" was changed to a reference to Cleveland to stay in theme with the show.

In the first season, Drew and Mimi worked under Mr. Bell, who existed only as a voice on Drew's speakerphone, excluding the season finale (his final episode, played by Kevin Pollak) wherein he is fired by Winfred-Louder's new owners. Other characters that appeared exclusively in this period were Drew's hillbilly neighbor Jules and his family. Drew's first girlfriend Lisa was introduced in this season, as was Jay, Kate's love interest who used to attend the same high school as Drew and his friends. Both characters lasted until Season 2, where they were quickly written out of the show in the early episodes.

Nine of the episode titles were related to chemistry in some way, with names such as "The Joining of Two Unlike Elements Is a Mixture" and "Isomers Have Distinct Characteristics". However, this theme was abandoned by the end of the season.

Seasons 2–7 (1996–2002)
"Moon Over Parma" was phased out during the second season by "Five O'Clock World" sung by The Vogues. This season introduced openings that paid homage to music videos which included the cast dancing and singing around the various sets of the show.

In the third season, the opening theme was changed to "Cleveland Rocks", a cover of an Ian Hunter song performed by The Presidents of the United States of America. The video consisted of shots of Cleveland ending with their ballpark. This change lasted until the second "wave" of the show ended, with the finale of Season 7.

The man who took over Mr. Bell's job after his firing was Nigel Wick, who served as a foil for both Drew and Mimi in the workplace. During this period, Drew and Mr. Wick also periodically took the top management job away from each other. This would usually result in Drew ending up back at his old job as assistant director of Personnel and Mr. Wick would miraculously retain his job as manager. By the end of Season 7, they were both Co-Managers before Winfred-Louder was closed down (albeit after undergoing drastic changes to stay in business). A recurring subplot involved Drew and his friends running a side business called "Buzz Beer," a microbrewery conceived through the concept of mixing coffee and beer. While several brand concepts and promotional stunts were plotted by Drew and his friends, their product failed to gain any true notoriety.

Kate and Oswald became closer and eventually became romantically involved and almost married during the third season, but Kate stood Oswald up at the altar. Kate and Drew also became romantically involved and were on the verge of getting married, but they called it off when they realized they did not feel the same about the prospect of children. Drew's cross-dressing brother Steve was introduced during this period. He eventually fell in love with Mimi and they had a child together, Gus (whose name was decided by means of a contest).

Drew also got married a number of times during this portion of the show. His first marriage was to Diane, a cocktail waitress in Las Vegas. This was only temporary however, as she needed Drew to retain custody of her children. His second marriage was to Mr. Wick, who forced Drew to marry him in a sham same-sex civil union in Vermont (the only place it was legal at the time) in hopes that the marriage would placate the Immigration and Naturalization Service. At the beginning of Season 7, Drew married both Nikki and Kate (the former had been a recurring character for some time since Season 3, and suffered from weight problems). They found out about this and all three of these marriages ended in divorce, and Drew became known as the "Impotent Bisexual Bigamist". Nikki eventually returned, and the actress, Kate Walsh, donned a fat suit again and moved in with Drew.

During this period the show also had frequent "event" episodes. Recurring themes were "What's Wrong With This Episode?", in which the show contained numerous deliberate continuity errors and other mistakes and invited viewers at home to find the most errors and win a prize, and live episodes, with loose plots and improvised scenes featuring cast members from Carey's improvisational comedy show Whose Line Is It Anyway? (Brad Sherwood, Wayne Brady, Colin Mochrie, Greg Proops, Chip Esten, Kathy Greenwood, Jeff Davis, Laura Hall, and Linda Taylor) contributed to these episodes, with Brad Sherwood hosting.

Seasons 8–9 (2002–2004)
Beginning in season 8, the show rotated through 9 different opening sequences, each of which contained a new version of one of the show's three theme songs. Each theme ("Moon Over Parma", "Five O'Clock World" and "Cleveland Rocks") was seen in three different segments, in new, wildly different arrangements. The show eventually went back to having just five main characters, akin to the first season, as Kate, Mr. Wick, and Steve were essentially written out of the show. Kate's character was married off, Mr. Wick disappeared after three appearances until the Season 8 finale, wherein it is revealed he became a weatherman (although he continued to appear in the opening credits, unlike Kate, who was eliminated, and never mentioned again.) Steve left at the beginning of the ninth season to "find himself".  While Kate O'Brien never reappears after she is married off, Steve and Mr. Wick each briefly reappear late in Season 9.

With Winfred-Louder closed, the location became the office of online retailer Neverending Store. Drew, Mimi, and Mr. Wick were hired as employees of the new company. Mimi was hired first in a similar role to her old job, and Drew was eventually hired as "Internal Expediting Analyst", and a recurring gag began wherein Drew had no clue as to what his job entailed. Before being written out, Mr. Wick was at first a janitor, and another recurring joke came in the form of Mr. Wick attempting to climb the ladder back to being the boss. Before being written out, he went from janitor to the carrier of the dessert trolley.

Kate left after the first two episodes of season 8, the same two episodes that introduced Kellie, an old high school friend of Drew's who had been working as a stripper. She eventually became a waitress at The Warsaw Tavern, Drew's girlfriend, and the carrier of his child. The plot of the final episode was Drew and Kellie attempting to get married before their child is born. Mr. Wick also returned and stayed on for the series finale.

The show began featuring cameos from reality-TV participants in the final two seasons, such as former Road Rules star Timmy Beggy, The Real World alumna Cara Khan, and The Amazing Race winner Reichen Lehmkuhl. Tony the Bus Driver (Bill Cobbs) became a regular, serving as smart-alecky "bartender" type to whom Drew could tell his problems. The eighth season was put in a timeslot that frequently clashed with Monday Night Football. It was pulled mid-season and the remaining episodes were shown during the summer of 2003. The ninth season did not air until the summer of 2004, with most of the episodes out of order.

The last season's tone changed radically from the previous seasons. The directors began experimenting with one-camera set-ups, showing the sets completely built, with four walls in most rooms, and with rooms actually linked together. The writers also began experimenting, including story lines in which Gus burns down Mimi's house, forcing her to move in with Drew after Steve leaves her.

Post-series
On March 24, 2009, Kathy Kinney appeared in character as Mimi at the beginning of The Late Late Show with Craig Ferguson. Kinney appeared twice on The Price Is Right as Mimi Bobeck on April Fools' Day. Drew Carey has been the host of the show since 2007. Carey would later revive the "What's Wrong with This Episode?" format for later April Fool's Day episodes of The Price Is Right.

As part of a 2012 April Fools Day prank by CBS, Drew Carey and Craig Ferguson swapped hosting duties, leaving Craig to host The Price Is Right and Drew to host The Late Late Show with Craig Ferguson.

The ending skit of the final episode of The Late Late Show with Craig Ferguson in 2014 was a spoof of the 1990 final episode of Newhart, in which Ferguson and Carey reprised their roles. Mr. Wick wakes up in bed with Carey, discovering that his decade as a talk show host and Carey's career as a game show host had been a dream.

Carey, Kinney, and Ryan Stiles all guest starred in the episode "Bigger Kids, Bigger Problems" (2019) of the ABC sitcom American Housewife, which stars Diedrich Bader.

Cast and characters

Main characters

Notes
 Christa Miller only appeared in the first and second episodes in Season 8.
 Kathy Kinney is credited as a guest star in the pilot episode, but she is credited as Starring from the second episode on.
 Craig Ferguson was credited as Starring in all episodes of Season 8, but only appeared in 4 episodes.
 John Carroll Lynch appeared in 8 episodes in Season 8, and was only credited as Starring for the episodes he appeared in.

Recurring characters

Regular guest stars
 Beulah Carey (Marion Ross) – Drew's mother
 George Carey (Stanley Anderson) – Drew's father
 Kim Harvey (Adrienne Barbeau) – Oswald's mother
 Mother Bobeck (Tammy Faye Bakker) – Mimi's mother
 Gigi Bobeck (Lynn Wanlass) – Mimi's sister
 King Augustus Antonio Carey (Dakota and Ryan Williams, Matthew Josten) – Drew's nephew, Steve and Mimi's son
 Misty Kiniski (June Lockhart) – Lewis's mother

Guest stars
 Nikki Cox as Drew's cousin Kirsten Carey, who briefly dates Mr. Wick in "Drew's Cousin"
 Shirley Jones as Drew's lady friend Celia (Season 4, 3 Episodes)
 Caroline Rhea as Drew's date, Bonnie, (Season 2, 2 Episodes)
 Pauley Perrette as Drew's girlfriend, Darcy (Season 4, 4 Episodes)
 Dan Castellaneta as Sal, the King of Poland in "Two Drews and the Queen of Poland Walk into A Bar" (all of his scenes were cut from reruns after complaints from the Polish community)
 Hal Linden as Mr. Van Zandt in the episode "Brotherhood of Man" (Season 5)
 Mark Curry as Robert Soulard
 John Ratzenberger as himself in Drew Live III
 Eddie Money as himself, the former husband of Mimi Bobeck
 Penn & Teller as Fenn and Geller in "Drew Meets Lawyers" (Season 1, Episode 6) and "See Drew Run" (Season 2, Episode 17)
 David Cross as Earl in "Drew and the Unstable Element" (Season 1, Episode 13) and "Two Drews & the Queen of Poland Walk into a Bar" (Season 2, Episode 20)
 Tim Allen as himself in "The Front" (Season 1, Episode 17)
 Norm Macdonald as Simon Tate in "The Bully You Know" (Season 2, Episode 4)
 Henry Rollins as E-Bay Ass Kicking Guy and Amy Farrington as Bonnie in "Hickory Dickory... Double Date" (Season 8, Episode 5)
 Richard Chamberlain as Mr. Wick's mother, Maggie in "Curse of the Mummy" (Season 7, Episode 14) and "Look Mom, One Hand!" (Season 7, Episode 25)
 Gregory Jbara as Ron in "Drew and the Conspiracy" (Season 4, Episode 1) and "Golden Boy" (Season 4, Episode 3)
 Charles Nelson Reilly as Mr. Hathaway, Lewis's boss, in "The Salon" (Season 3) and "DrugCo" (Season 4)
 Joe Walsh as Ed, a guitarist (in several episodes)
 French Stewart as Buddy in "Drew's Best Friend" (Season 9, Episode 10)
 Fred Willard as shady con man/travel agent, Fred Tuttle (Season 9, Episode 11)
 Colin Mochrie as Eugene in "She's Gotta Have It", "Drew Live", and "Drew Live II"
 Brad Sherwood as himself/host of "Drew Live" and "Drew Live II"
 Wayne Brady as himself in "Drew Live" and "Drew Live II"
 Greg Proops, Chip Esten and Kathy Greenwood as themselves in "Drew Live II"
 Chris Palmer, head coach for the Cleveland Browns
 Susan Saint James (Christa Miller's real life aunt) as Kate's mother in "Drew and Kate and Kate's Mother"
 Jamie Lee Curtis  as Sioux in "Playing a Unified Field"
 Steve Buscemi  as Mimi's lawyer in "Mr. Louder's Birthday Party"
 Micky Dolenz as Mr. Metcalf in "Drew and the King" (Season 7, Episode 13)
 Tom Poston as Oswald's father (Season 6, Episode 13)
 Beata Pozniak as Raisa in "What Women Don't Want"
 Julia Duffy as Lindsey Mercer, Lord Mercer's ex-wife who temporarily takes control of Winfred-Louder in "Rich Woman, Poor Man" (Season 7, Episode 23)
 Nicholas Turturro as the New York detective in "New York and Queens" (Season 2, Episode 24)
 Mike McShane as Ray in "Drew's Inheritance" (Season 6, Episode 3)
 Phyllis Diller as Mimi's grandmother (Season 7, Episode 25)
 Megyn Price as Waitress at Warsaw Tavern in "Drew and Mr. Bell's Nephew" (Season 1, Episode 14) and "Miss Right" (Season 1, Episode 2)
 Dave Winfield as himself in "Science Names Suck" (Season 1, Episode 10)
 Jenny McCarthy as various roles in "Drew Carey's Back-to-School Rock 'n' Roll Comedy Hour" (Season 7, Episodes 1 and 2) and as a Police officer Drew dates in "A Shot In The Dark" (Season 7, Episode 17)
 Amanda Bynes as various roles in "Drew Carey's Back-to-School Rock 'n' Roll Comedy Hour" (Season 7, Episodes 1 and 2)
Tim Conway as a senior-home resident who temporarily costs Drew his job (Season 3, Episode 11)
Brent Hinkley as Frederick (Season 3, Episode 24)

Special appearances
 Little Richard as himself in "Drewstock" (season 2, Episode 14)
 Donald Trump and Carol Channing as themselves in "New York and Queens" (Season 2, Episode 24)
 Rush Limbaugh as himself in "The Salon" (Season 3)
 Dionne Warwick as herself, shopping at Winfred-Louder (Season 3, Episode 9)
 The Reverend Horton Heat as The Underprivileged in "That Thing You Don't" (Season 3, Episode 10)
 "Weird Al" Yankovic as himself in "Drew Between the Rock and a Hard Place" (Season 4)
 Joe Alaskey as Daffy Duck (Applies at Drew's work place for a job in scene before opening title) in "My Best Friend's Wedding"
 Paul "Triple H" Levesque as The Disciplinarian, Pro Wrestler Sponsor for Buzz Beer
 Slash, Rick Nielsen, Dusty Hill, Matthew Sweet, Joey Ramone, Lisa Loeb, Dave Mustaine, Roy Clark, Jonny Lang, and Michael Stanley as themselves and Joe Walsh as Ed in "In Ramada Da Vida" (Season 4, Episode 2)
 Ben Stein as St. Peter
 The James Gang as themselves at the end of Season 4, Episode 4
 Debbie Lee Carrington as Mini Mimi in Season 5, Episode 1
 The Go-Go's as themselves in "The Pregnancy Scare" (season 6, episode 6) 
 Lemmy Kilmister and his band Motörhead as themselves in "Drew Gets Out of the Nut House" in Season 7, playing a loud song with altered lyrics from Mimi to apologize for putting Drew in a mental institution
 Kristen Wiig as Sandy, in realtor in "House of the Rising Son-in-Law" (Season 9, Episode 12)

Episodes

Viva Las Vegas

The episode "Drew Gets Married" is part of a crossover with Grace Under Fire, Coach and Ellen set in Las Vegas. It features Brett Butler as Grace Kelly, Jerry Van Dyke as Luther Van Dam, Joely Fisher as Paige Clark and Jeremy Piven as Spence Kovak.

Ratings
The show initially finished outside of the Top 30 in the Nielsen ratings, at #48. In the second season, ratings improved, and the series jumped into the Top 30, remaining there for the next three seasons as well. The sixth season finished just outside of the Top 30, at #37. This is attributable to the erosion of network audiences that began in the late 1990s.

After its sixth season, ABC and Warner Bros. negotiated to keep the series on through the 2003-04 television season, which would place it in its ninth season. However, in its seventh season, The Drew Carey Show experienced a dramatic ratings drop, as did several other ABC series. A schedule move by ABC for the eighth season resulted in even worse ratings, falling out of the Top 100. At midseason, ABC placed the series on hiatus, and attempted to get out of the contract with Warner Bros. When they were unable to, the network finished the eighth season in the summer, and decided to burn off the ninth and final season during the summer of 2004. The series finale was viewed by a little over 5 million viewers.

Average seasonal ratings

Syndication
The Drew Carey Show entered off-network syndication in September 1999 and continued until September 2008 airing on independent stations and the affiliates of Fox, UPN, and The WB.

The series began airing on TBS in October 2002, with reruns airing on the network until November 2007. ION aired reruns of the show from 2007 to 2009, premiering on December 31, 2007 (New Year's Eve), with the station promoting it as "The Drew Year." ION Television did not air all of the episodes as it only aired the episodes that aired from seasons 1–5; the channel also removed extremely sexual references from certain episodes, the season 5 episode "Do Drew and Kate Have Sex?" being one in particular.

The CW also aired episodes during the 2008–09 television season. Two back-to-back episodes were aired on Sundays at 6:00pm to replace the cancelled Sunday Night Block by Media Rights Capital.

In Canada, the show ran in syndication on TVtropolis until June 2013, when the channel was rebranded as DTour. The series also aired on DejaView.

Laff began carrying the show as part of its inaugural lineup when it launched in April 2015. The series was dropped from Laff's lineup in the fall of 2019.

Rewind TV began airing The Drew Carey Show reruns in December 2021.

Merchandise
During the height of the show's popularity, Barbie-esque dolls of Drew and Mimi were released, with accessories and are currently in rare supply and considered collector's items. Matchbox also released Drew's car, a Volkswagen Beetle with flames on the sides which Drew owned from the third season until the eighth. The soundtrack album Cleveland Rocks! Music from The Drew Carey Show was released in May 1998.

Home media

On February 28, 2006, a six-episode release of the sitcom was released on DVD titled The Drew Carey Show: TV Favorites. Initially, the DVD was exclusively sold at Best Buy, but later sold at other national retailers as well. The DVD features the episodes "Pilot," "Playing the Unified Field," "We'll Remember Always, Evaluation Day," "Drew Blows His Promotion," "My Best Friend's Wedding," and "DrugCo." However, this DVD has since gone out of print.

On April 24, 2007, Warner Home Video released the complete first season of The Drew Carey Show on DVD in Region 1. Warner Bros. has released a statement in which it said that the reason as to why the second season, and any of the later seasons have yet to be released to this day is because of copyright issues regarding music used on the show. For the same reason, it is unlikely ever to stream on online services.

The first season was released in Australia (Region 4) on September 10, 2008.

Notes

References

External links

 
 The Drew Carey Show ABC homepage
 Season 1 DVD information

1995 American television series debuts
2004 American television series endings
1990s American workplace comedy television series
2000s American workplace comedy television series
1990s American single-camera sitcoms
2000s American single-camera sitcoms
American Broadcasting Company original programming
Cultural depictions of American men
English-language television shows
Television series by Mohawk Productions
Television series by Warner Bros. Television Studios
Television series created by Bruce Helford
Television shows set in Cleveland
Television series set in shops